The nuthatches constitute a genus, Sitta, of small passerine birds belonging to the family Sittidae. Characterised by large heads, short tails, and powerful bills and feet, nuthatches advertise their territory using loud, simple songs. Most species exhibit grey or bluish upperparts and a black eye stripe.

Most nuthatches breed in the temperate or montane woodlands of the Northern Hemisphere, although two species have adapted to rocky habitats in the warmer and drier regions of Eurasia. However, the greatest diversity is in Southern Asia, and similarities between the species have made it difficult to identify distinct species. All members of this genus nest in holes or crevices. Most species are non-migratory and live in their habitat year-round, although the North American red-breasted nuthatch migrates to warmer regions during the winter. A few nuthatch species have restricted ranges and face threats from deforestation.

Nuthatches are omnivorous, eating mostly insects, nuts, and seeds. They forage for insects hidden in or under bark by climbing along tree trunks and branches, sometimes upside-down. They forage within their territories when breeding, but they may join mixed feeding flocks at other times. 

Their habit of wedging a large food item in a crevice and then hacking at it with their strong bills gives this group its English name.

Taxonomy

The nuthatch family, Sittidae, was described by René-Primevère Lesson in 1828. 

Sometimes the wallcreeper (Tichodroma muraria), which is restricted to the mountains of southern Eurasia, is placed in the same family as the nuthatches, but in a separate subfamily "Tichodromadinae", in which case the nuthatches are classified in the subfamily "Sittinae". However, it is more often placed in a separate family, the Tichodromadidae. 

The wallcreeper is intermediate in its morphology between the nuthatches and the treecreepers, but its appearance, the texture of its plumage, and the shape and pattern of its tail suggest that it is closer to the former taxon. 

The nuthatch vanga of Madagascar (formerly known as the coral-billed nuthatch) and the sittellas from Australia and New Guinea were once placed in the nuthatch family because of similarities in appearance and lifestyle, but they are not closely related. The resemblances arose via convergent evolution to fill an ecological niche.

The nuthatches' closest relatives, other than the wallcreeper, are the treecreepers, and the two (or three) families are sometimes placed in a larger grouping with the wrens and gnatcatchers. This superfamily, the Certhioidea, is proposed on phylogenetic studies using mitochondrial and nuclear DNA, and was created to cover a clade of (four or) five families removed from a larger grouping of passerine birds, the Sylvioidea.

Genus name
The nuthatches are all in the genus Sitta Linnaeus, 1758, a name derived from  : , Ancient Greek for this bird. 

The English term nuthatch refers to the propensity of some species to wedge a large insect or seed in a crack and hack at it with their strong bills.

Species boundaries
Species boundaries in the nuthatches are difficult to define. The red-breasted nuthatch, Corsican nuthatch and Chinese nuthatch have breeding ranges separated by thousands of kilometres, but are similar in habitat preference, appearance and song. They were formerly considered to be one species, but are now normally split into three and comprise a superspecies along with the Krüper's and Algerian nuthatch. Unusually for nuthatches, all five species excavate their own nests.

The Eurasian, chestnut-vented, Kashmir and chestnut-bellied nuthatches form another superspecies and replace each other geographically across Asia. They are currently considered to be four separate species, but the south Asian forms were once believed to be a subspecies of the Eurasian nuthatch. A recent change in this taxonomy is a split of the chestnut-bellied nuthatch into three species, namely the Indian nuthatch, Sitta castanea, found south of the Ganges, the Burmese nuthatch, Sitta neglecta, found in southeast Asia, and the chestnut-bellied nuthatch sensu stricto, S. cinnamoventris, which occurs in the Himalayas. Mitochondrial DNA studies have demonstrated that the white-breasted northern subspecies of Eurasian nuthatch, S. (europea) arctica, is distinctive, and also a possible candidate for full species status. This split has been accepted by the British Ornithologists' Union.

A 2006 review of Asian nuthatches suggested that there are still unresolved problems in nuthatch taxonomy and proposed splitting the genus Sitta. This suggestion would move the red- and yellow-billed south Asian species (velvet-fronted, yellow-billed and sulphur-billed nuthatches) to a new genus, create a third genus for the blue nuthatch, and possibly a fourth for the beautiful nuthatch.

The fossil record for this group appears to be restricted to a foot bone of an early Miocene bird from Bavaria which has been identified as an extinct representative of the climbing Certhioidea, a clade comprising the treecreepers, wallcreeper and nuthatches. It has been described as Certhiops rummeli. Two fossil species have been described in the genus Sitta: S. cuvieri Gervais, 1852 and S. senogalliensis Portis, 1888, but they probably do not belong to nuthatches.

Description

Nuthatches are compact birds with short legs, compressed wings, and square 12-feathered tails. They have long, sturdy, pointed bills and strong toes with long claws. Nuthatches have blue-grey backs (violet-blue in some Asian species, which also have red or yellow bills) and white underparts, which are variably tinted with buff, orange, rufous or lilac. Although head markings vary between species, a long black eye stripe, with contrasting white supercilium, dark forehead and blackish cap is common. The sexes look similar, but may differ in underpart colouration, especially on the rear flanks and under the tail. Juveniles and first-year birds can be almost indistinguishable from adults.

Nuthatches are very vocal, using an assortment of whistles, trills and calls. Their breeding songs tend to be simple and often identical to their contact calls but longer in duration. The red-breasted nuthatch, which coexists with the black-capped chickadee throughout much of its range, is able to understand the latter species' calls. The chickadee has subtle call variations that communicate information about the size and risk of potential predators. Many birds recognise the simple alarm calls produced by other species, but the red-breasted nuthatch is able to interpret the chickadees' detailed variations and to respond appropriately.

Species
The species diversity for Sittidae is greatest in southern Asia (possibly the original home of this family), where about 15 species occur, but it has representatives across much of the Northern Hemisphere. The currently recognised nuthatch species are tabulated below.

Distribution and habitat

Members of the nuthatch family live in most of North America and Europe and throughout Asia down to the Wallace Line. Nuthatches are sparsely represented in Africa; one species lives in a small area of northeastern Algeria and a population of the Eurasian nuthatch subspecies, S. e. hispaniensis, lives in the mountains of Morocco. Most species are resident year-round. The only significant migrant is the red-breasted nuthatch, which winters widely across North America, deserting the northernmost parts of its breeding range in Canada; it has been recorded as a vagrant in Bermuda, Iceland and England.

Most nuthatches are woodland birds and the majority are found in coniferous or other evergreen forests, although each species has a preference for a particular tree type. The strength of the association varies from the Corsican nuthatch, which is closely linked with Corsican pine, to the catholic habitat of the Eurasian nuthatch, which prefers deciduous or mixed woods but breeds in coniferous forests in the north of its extensive range. However, the two species of rock nuthatches are not strongly tied to woodlands: they breed on rocky slopes or cliffs, although both move into wooded areas when not breeding. In parts of Asia where several species occur in the same geographic region, there is often an altitudinal separation in their preferred habitats.

Nuthatches prefer a fairly temperate climate; northern species live near sea level whereas those further south are found in cooler highland habitats. The velvet-fronted nuthatch is the sole member of the family which prefers tropical lowland forests.

Behaviour

Nesting, breeding and survival

All nuthatches nest in cavities; except for the two species of rock nuthatches, all use tree holes, making a simple cup lined with soft materials on which to rest eggs. In some species the lining consists of small woody objects such as bark flakes and seed husks, while in others it includes the moss, grass, hair and feathers typical of passerine birds.

Members of the red-breasted nuthatch superspecies excavate their own tree holes, although most other nuthatches use natural holes or old woodpecker nests. Several species reduce the size of the entrance hole and seal up cracks with mud. The red-breasted nuthatch makes the nest secure by daubing sticky conifer resin globules around the entrance, the male applying the resin outside and the female inside. The resin may deter predators or competitors (the resident birds avoid the resin by diving straight through the entrance hole). The white-breasted nuthatch smears blister beetles around the entrance to its nest, and it has been suggested that the unpleasant smell from the crushed insects deters squirrels, its chief competitor for natural tree cavities.

The western rock nuthatch builds an elaborate flask-shaped nest from mud, dung and hair or feathers, and decorates the nest's exterior and nearby crevices with feathers and insect wings. The nests are located in rock crevices, in caves, under cliff overhangs or on buildings. The eastern rock nuthatch builds a similar but less complex structure across the entrance to a cavity. Its nest can be quite small but may weigh up to 32 kg (70 lb). This species will also nest in river banks or tree holes and will enlarge its nest hole if it the cavity is too small.

Nuthatches are monogamous. The female produces eggs that are white with red or yellow markings; the clutch size varies, tending to be larger for northern species. The eggs are incubated for 12 to 18 days by the female alone, or by both parents, depending on the species. The altricial (naked and helpless) chicks take between 21 and 27 days to fledge. Both parents feed the young, and in the case of two American species, brown-headed and pygmy, helper males from the previous brood may assist the parents in feeding.

For the few species on which data are available, the average nuthatch lifespan in the wild is between 2 and 3.5 years, although ages of up to 10 years have been recorded. The Eurasian nuthatch has an adult annual survival rate of 53% and the male Corsican nuthatch 61.6%. Nuthatches and other small woodland birds share the same predators: accipiters, owls, squirrels and woodpeckers. An American study showed that nuthatch responses to predators may be linked to reproductive strategies. It measured the willingness of males of two species to feed incubating females on the nest when presented with models of a sharp-shinned hawk, which hunts adult nuthatches, or a house wren, which destroys eggs. The white-breasted nuthatch is shorter-lived than the red-breasted nuthatch, but has more young, and was found to respond more strongly to the egg predator, whereas the red-breasted showed greater concern with the hawk. This supports the theory that longer-lived species benefit from adult survival and future breeding opportunities while birds with shorter life spans place more value on the survival of their larger broods.

Cold can be a problem for small birds that do not migrate. Communal roosting in tight huddles can help conserve heat and several nuthatch species employ it—up to 170 pygmy nuthatches have been seen in a single roost. The pygmy nuthatch is able to lower its body temperature when roosting, conserving energy through hypothermia and a lowered metabolic rate.

Feeding

Nuthatches forage along tree trunks and branches and are members of the same feeding guild as woodpeckers. Unlike woodpeckers and treecreepers, however, they do not use their tails for additional support, relying instead on their strong legs and feet to progress in jerky hops. They are able to descend head-first and hang upside-down beneath twigs and branches. Krüper's nuthatch can even stretch downward from an upside-down position to drink water from leaves without touching the ground. Rock nuthatches forage with a similar technique to the woodland species, but seek food on rock faces and sometimes buildings. When breeding, a pair of nuthatches will only feed within their territory, but at other times will associate with passing tits or join mixed-species feeding flocks.

Insects and other invertebrates are a major portion of the nuthatch diet, especially during the breeding season, when they rely almost exclusively on live prey, but most species also eat seeds during the winter, when invertebrates are less readily available. Larger food items, such as big insects, snails, acorns or seeds may be wedged into cracks and pounded with the bird's strong bill. Unusually for a bird, the brown-headed nuthatch uses a piece of tree bark as a lever to pry up other bark flakes to look for food; the bark tool may then be carried from tree to tree or used to cover a seed cache.

All nuthatches appear to store food, especially seeds, in tree crevices, in the ground, under small stones, or behind bark flakes, and these caches are remembered for as long as 30 days. Similarly, the rock nuthatches wedge snails into suitable crevices for consumption in times of need. European nuthatches have been found to avoid using their caches during benign conditions in order to save them for harsher times.

Conservation status

Some nuthatches, such as the Eurasian nuthatch and the North American species, have extensive ranges and large populations, and few conservation problems, although locally they may be affected by woodland fragmentation. In contrast, some of the more restricted species face severe pressures.

Nearly 12,000 people live in the Natma Taung national park which includes Mount Victoria, and their fires and traps add to the pressure on the nuthatch. The population of the white-browed nuthatch, estimated at only a few thousand, is decreasing, and no conservation measures are in place. The Algerian nuthatch is found in only four areas of Algeria, and it is possible that the total population does not exceed 1,000 birds. Fire, erosion, and grazing and disturbance by livestock have reduced the quality of the habitat, despite its location in the Taza National Park.

Deforestation has also caused population declines for the vulnerable Yunnan and yellow-billed nuthatches. The Yunnan nuthatch can cope with some tree loss, since it prefers open pine woodland, but although still locally common, it has disappeared from several of the areas in which it was recorded in the early 20th century. The threat to yellow-billed is particularly acute on Hainan, where more than 70% of the woodland has been lost in the past 50 years due to shifting cultivation and the use of wood for fuel during Chinese government re-settlement programmes.

Krüper's nuthatch is threatened by urbanisation and development in and around mature coniferous forests, particularly in the Mediterranean coastal areas where the species was once numerous. A law promoting tourism came into force in Turkey in 2003, further exacerbating the threats to their habitat. The law reduced bureaucracy and made it easier for developers to build tourism facilities and summer houses in the coastal zone where woodland loss is a growing problem for the nuthatch.

Notes

References

External links

Nuthatches
Sittidae
Taxa named by René Lesson